The Central Elbe Table is a plateau and a geomorphological mesoregion of the Czech Republic. It is located mostly in the Central Bohemian Region, but due to its size, it also extends to other regions. The axis of the plateau is the river Elbe, after which the territory is named.

Geomorphology
The Central Elbe Table is a mesoregion of the Central Bohemian Table within the Bohemian Massif. Typical features of the landscape are wide valley floodplains, low terraces, and tectonic and denudation depressions. The plateau is further subdivided into the microregions of Nymburk Basin, Čáslav Basin, Mělník Basin, Mrlina Table and Český Brod Table.

Due to the nature of the plateau, there are no significant peaks.

Geography
The territory has a predominantly elongated shape from northwest to southeast. It is the sixth largest mesoregion in the Czech Republic. Most of the Central Elbe Table is located in the Central Bohemian Region, but it also extends into Prague in the southwest and to the Hradec Králové and Pardubice regions in the east. A large part of the territory overlaps with the informally defined region of Polabí. The axis of the territory is the river Elbe, into which a number of other important rivers flow: Vltava, Jizera, Mrlina and others.

Suitable natural conditions contributed to the creation of many settlements in the Central Elbe Table. In addition to the fact that the northern suburbs of Prague are located here, the most populated towns in the territory are Kolín, Mělník, Brandýs nad Labem-Stará Boleslav, Kralupy nad Vltavou, Neratovice, Nymburk, Poděbrady, Čelákovice, Čáslav, Lysá nad Labem and Český Brod. Partly located in the Central Elbe Table are Kutná Hora and Milovice.

Vegetation
The landscape has predominantly an agricultural character and is relatively sparsely forested.

Gallery

References

Landforms of the Czech Republic
Geography of the Central Bohemian Region
Plateaus of Europe